Bewitched is an American fantasy situation comedy originally broadcast for eight seasons on ABC from 1964 to 1972. 254 half-hour episodes were produced. The first 74 half-hour episodes were filmed in black-and-white for Seasons 1 and 2 (but are now available in colorized versions on DVD); the remaining 180 half-hour episodes were filmed in color. Film dates are the dates the Screen Gems distribution company reported the episode was "finished".

Series overview

Dick York missed a total of 14 episodes during his five years on the show (1964-1969) due to a degenerative back ailment that limited his mobility. These episodes are denoted with †.

Episodes

Season 1 (1964–65)
Episodes originally filmed in black-and-white, but were colorized.

Season 2 (1965–66)
Episodes originally filmed in black-and-white, but were colorized.

Season 3 (1966–67)
Episodes in Season 3 and onwards filmed in color

Season 4 (1967–68)

Season 5 (1968–69)

Season 6 (1969–70)

Season 7 (1970–71)

Season 8 (1971–72)

References

External links
 

 
Lists of American sitcom episodes
Lists of fantasy television series episodes